This is a list of awards and nominations received by Filipino actress Julia Montes. Montes has been recognized with multiple awards and nominations for her work in film and television, winning 2 Gawad Tanglaw Awards for Best Actress, and a Princess of Philippine Television Award. She has also been nominated for 2 PMPC Star Award in the Best Supporting Drama Actress and Best Drama Actress category, a Young Critics Circle Award for Best Performance, and a FAMAS Awards for Best Actress.

After playing minor roles in several films and television shows, Montes starred in her breakout role in the remake of Mara Clara (2010–11). In 2012, she won a Princess of Philippine Television Award for the acclaimed romantic drama Walang Hanggan. The television show also garnered her 4 FMTM Awards including Most Improved Actress. The following year, her performance in A Moment in Time (2013) garnered her a nomination for FAMAS Awards for Best Actress. For her performance in the period drama Ikaw Lamang (2014), she won a Gawad Tanglaw Award for Best Actress and received a nomination for the PMPC Star Award for Best Drama Supporting Actress. In 2015, she received a nomination for a Young Critics Circle Award for Best Performance in the romantic horror Halik sa Hangin. The same year, she starred in a dual role as twin sisters Kara Dela Rosa and Sara Suarez in the melodrama Doble Kara (2015–17), which won her second Gawad Tanglaw Award in the Best Actress category and another PMPC Star Award nomination for Best Drama Actress. The television series also garnered her a Leading Lady of the Year award from the TV Series Craze.

Major associations

FAMAS Awards
The FAMAS Award is an annual award given by the Filipino Academy of Movie Arts and Sciences (FAMAS), for achievements in the Philippine cinema for a calendar year. Established since 1952, the FAMAS Awards is the highest Filipino film award a filmmaker or artisan could receive in the local movie industry. Montes has received one award from two nominations.

PMPC Star Awards
The PMPC Star Award is annual award giving body recognizing the outstanding programming produced by the several TV networks in the Philippines every year. It was founded by the Philippine Movie Press Club in 1987. These are the award categories to be given away yearly. Montes has received two nominations.

Gawad Tanglaw Awards
The Gawad Tanglaw Award is an award conferred upon movie artists and filmmakers for excellence in film. The awards are given to artists and directors of movies for general patronage. It also honors men and women who stand out in the development and archiving of Philippine cinema. Montes has received two awards.

Young Critics Circle
The Young Critics Circle is a society of film critics and an award-giving body for cinema in the Philippines. It was established in 1990 and had its first awarding in 1991. Montes has received one nomination.

GMMSF Box-Office Entertainment Awards
The GMMSF Box-Office Entertainment Award is an annual award ceremony held in Metro Manila. The award-giving body honors stars and performers simply for their popularity and commercial success in the Philippine entertainment industry. Montes has received one award.

Golden Screen TV Awards
The Golden Screen TV Award is a yearly awards night recognizes the outstanding programs and personalities from different TV networks in the country. It is created in 2004 by the Entertainment Press Society (ENPRESS), a group of entertainment writers from newspapers. The awards night is usually held in March. Montes has received one award.

Minor associations

Audience awards

Accolades from media

Notes

References

External links
 

Montes, Julia